Brian Nickholz (born 22 December 1989) is a German politician of the Social Democratic Party (SPD) who has been serving as a member of the Bundestag since 2021.

Life and politics
Nickholz was born 1989 in Gelsenkirchen and entered the SPD in 2005. He was elected directly to the Bundestag in 2021 and has since been serving on the Committee on Housing, Urban Development, Building and Local Government.

Other activities
 IG Bergbau, Chemie, Energie (IG BCE), Member

Personal life
Nickholz shares an apartment with fellow parliamentarians Ye-One Rhie and Lena Werner in the Moabit district of Berlin.

References 

Living people
1989 births
People from Gelsenkirchen
Social Democratic Party of Germany politicians
Members of the Bundestag 2021–2025
21st-century German politicians